The island of Bali has a system of social organization similar to the Indian caste system.

The four castes of Bali are:
Sudras (Shudras) – peasants making up close to 93% of Bali’s population.
Wesias (Vaishyas) – the caste of merchants and administrative officials
Satrias (Kshatriyas) – the warriors caste, it also included some nobility and kings
Brahmanas (Brahmins) – the priests caste

Pre-modern Bali had four castes, as Jeff Lewis and Belinda Lewis state, but with a "very strong tradition of communal decision-making and interdependence".

The 19th-century scholars such as Crawfurd and Friederich suggested that the Balinese caste system had Indian origins, but Helen Creese states that scholars such as Brumund who had visited and stayed on the island of Bali suggested that his field observations conflicted with the "received understandings concerning its Indian origins". In Bali, the Shudra (locally spelled Soedra) have typically been the temple priests, though depending on the demographics, a temple priest may also be from the other three castes. 

In most regions, it has been the Shudra who typically make offerings to the gods on behalf of the Hindu devotees, chant prayers, recite meweda (Vedas), and set the course of Balinese temple festivals.

The members of the four castes use different levels of the Balinese language to address members of a different caste.  Middle Balinese is generally used to speak to people whose caste is unknown in an encounter.  Once the caste status of the participants are established, the proper language is used to address each other.

Nowadays, the caste system is used more in religious settings where the members of the lower caste would ask the members of the Brahman caste (the Pedandas) to conduct ceremonies. Since the Dutch colonial years and more recently after the Indonesian independence, the differences in the economic roles of the members of the caste system are slowly eroding as the government prohibits treatments based on the caste system.

Most of the Kshatriya families in Java and Bali became extinct during the fall of the Majapahit and the numerous Javanese wars. Almost all of the Balinese Kshatriyas trace their origin to the royal family of King Deva Agung, who ruled 500 years before. Some of the original Kshatriyas, such as those claiming descent from Arya Damar, were relegated to Wesia status, so only those claiming descent from Deva Agung are recognized as proper Kshatriya in Bali.

During the 1950s and 1960s, there were conflicts between supporters of the traditional caste system in Bali and its opponents. Many of the latter were affiliated with the PKI, the Communist Party of Indonesia, which was violently suppressed during the Indonesian killings of 1965–1966, leading to the death of some 80,000 Balinese, around 5% of the population at the time.

See also

 Balinese Hinduism
 Balinese Kshatriya
 Caste

References 

Caste system by country
Society of Indonesia
Hindu law
Balinese culture